Cherkesovsky is a rural locality (a khutor) and the administrative center of Cherkesovskoye Rural Settlement, Novoanninsky District, Volgograd Oblast, Russia. The population was 1,545 as of 2010. There are 29 streets.

Geography 
Cherkesovsky is located in steppe on the Khopyorsko-Buzulukskaya Plain, on the bank of the Kumylga River, 27 km northwest of Novoanninsky (the district's administrative centre) by road. Pyshkinsky is the nearest rural locality.

References 

Rural localities in Novoanninsky District